People of the State of New York v. Exxon Mobil Corp. is a lawsuit filed on October 24, 2018, in the New York Supreme Court. The suit alleges fraud by Exxon Mobil Corporation to mislead the company's investors about management of risks posed by climate change. On November 15, 2018, the court signed a preliminary conference order scheduling the trial to begin on October 23, 2019.

On October 22, the trial began before Judge Barry Ostrager, with opening statements by both sides. According to the New York Times, the case was "only the second climate change lawsuit to reach trial in the United States." On November 7, 2019, the New York Attorney General dropped two of the four counts regarding civil fraud after admitting there was insufficient evidence to support the charges. 

On December 10, 2019, Justice Ostrager found for Exxon Mobil on the remaining counts accusing it of fraud.

See also
Climate change in the United States
ExxonMobil climate change controversy
Kivalina v. ExxonMobil Corp.

References

Further reading
 Pierce, Charles P. (August 7, 2019). “The Oil Giants Might Finally Pay for Pulling the Biggest Hoax of All”. Esquire. Retrieved August 8, 2019.

United States environmental case law
ExxonMobil litigation
Climate change litigation
New York Supreme Court cases
2019 in United States case law
2019 in the environment
2019 in New York (state)